Helen Denerley (born 1956) is a Scottish sculptor. Much of her work is made from reused scrap and is inspired by the animal world.

Notable public sculpture includes Dreaming Spires (two giraffes) on Leith Walk, Edinburgh, unveiled in July 2005. Other works include Dragons at the Eniwa Garden Project, Hokkaido, Japan; various sculptures at the Horizon Enterprise Park, Forres; and a large fossil at the Hugh Miller Museum, Cromarty.

Denerley lives in Strathdon, Aberdeenshire.

References

External links
Helen Denerley's website
Kilmorack Gallery website

Scottish sculptors
1956 births
Living people
Scottish women sculptors